The enzyme 4-pyridoxolactonase (EC 3.1.1.27) catalyzes the reaction 

4-pyridoxolactone + H2O  4-pyridoxate

This enzyme belongs to the family of hydrolases, specifically those acting on carboxylic ester bonds.  The systematic name is 4-pyridoxolactone lactonohydrolase. It participates in vitamin B6 metabolism.

References

 

EC 3.1.1
Enzymes of unknown structure